Murbeckiella sousae is a species of flowering plant in the mustard family Brassicaceae, endemic to the central and northern mountains of continental Portugal. It inhabits cracks in rocks, escarpments, embankments of paths. On siliceous substrates, mainly schists, in mountain areas.

References

Brassicaceae
Endemic flora of Portugal
Endemic flora of the Iberian Peninsula